St John the Baptist's Church is in Church Lane, Smallwood, Cheshire, England.  It is an active Anglican parish church in the deanery of Congleton, the archdeaconry of Macclesfield, and the diocese of Chester.  Its benefice is combined with those of St Mary, Astbury, and All Saints, Somerford.  The church is recorded in the National Heritage List for England as a designated Grade II listed building.

History

St John's was built between 1843 and 1846, and designed by Charles and James Trubshaw.

Architecture

The church is constructed in yellow sandstone rubble with ashlar dressings and has slate roofs.  Its plan consists of a nave, a southwest porch, a chancel, and a northwest vestry.  On the west gable is a single bellcote.  The windows are lancets, some of which contain Y-tracery.  At the east end is a triple stepped lancet window.  At the corners of the church are angle buttresses.  Inside the church is a hammerbeam roof.

See also

Listed buildings in Smallwood, Cheshire

References

Church of England church buildings in Cheshire
Grade II listed churches in Cheshire
Churches completed in 1846
19th-century Church of England church buildings
Gothic Revival church buildings in England
Gothic Revival architecture in Cheshire
Diocese of Chester